Lingual lipase is a member of a family of digestive enzymes called triacylglycerol lipases, EC 3.1.1.3, that use the catalytic triad of aspartate, histidine, and serine to hydrolyze medium and long-chain triglycerides into partial glycerides and free fatty acids. The enzyme, released into the mouth along with the saliva, catalyzes the first reaction in the digestion of dietary lipid, with diglycerides being the primary reaction product. However, due to the unique characteristics of lingual lipase, including a pH optimum 4.5–5.4 and its ability to catalyze reactions without bile salts, the lipolytic activity continues through to the stomach. Enzyme release is signaled by autonomic nervous system after ingestion, at which time the serous glands under the circumvallate and foliate lingual papillae on the surface of the tongue secrete lingual lipase to the grooves of the circumvallate and foliate papillae, co-localized with fat taste receptors. The hydrolysis of the dietary fats is essential for fat absorption by the small intestine, as long chain triacylglycerides cannot be absorbed, and as much as 30% of fat is hydrolyzed within 1 to 20 minutes of ingestion by lingual lipase alone.

Lingual lipase, together with gastric lipase, comprise the two acidic lipases.

Proposed mechanism 

Lingual lipase uses a catalytic triad consisting of aspartic acid-203 (Asp), histidine-257 (His), and serine-144 (Ser), to initiate the hydrolysis of a triglyceride into a diacylglyceride and a free fatty acid.  First, there is a series of deprotonations that make the serine a better  nucleophile. The lone pair on the oxygen of the serine then undergoes a nucleophilic addition to either the first or the third carbonyl of the triacylglycerol. Next, the electrons that had moved to form the carbonyl transfer back down to reform the carbonyl. Then the diacylglycerol leaving group is protonated by His-257. Following another round of deprotonations, the lone pair on the oxygen of water undergoes a nucleophilic addition to the carbonyl that reformed in the previous step. The electrons that had moved up from the carbonyl come back down to reform it and kick off the Ser, which again induces the chain of deprotonation. The final products of the reaction are the conserved catalytic triad, a diacylglycerol and a free fatty acid. Monoacylglyceride is also present in a lower concentration and is produced following a second round of hydrolysis by the same mechanism. It acts on tryglicerides to help breakdown food as a part of saliva composition.

Cystic fibrosis 
Patients with cystic fibrosis (CF) have an 85% chance of additionally experiencing the effects of exocrine pancreatic insufficiency. In the most extreme cases, these patients will produce no pancreatic lipase, yet even when the enzyme is completely absent, dietary fat is still absorbed. Studies have shown that even in these cases, lingual lipase is present in normal amounts, and contributes to greater than 90% of total lipase activity in duodenum. This can be attributed to the fact that lingual lipase has a low pH optimum and can thus remain active through the stomach into the duodenum, where there is a low pH in patients with CF. It has, thus, been proposed that a possible treatment option for exocrine pancreatic insufficiency would be enzyme replacement therapy using lingual lipase, increasing the amount of dietary fat absorption and decreasing the risk of malnutrition. The proposed mechanism of lingual lipase preferentially cleaving short and medium chain triacylglycerols provides a means for absorption without the need for micelle formation and chylomicrons. Short and medium chain free fatty acids can be absorbed directly through the mucosal cells into the blood stream without further packaging and hence play a crucial role in nutrition for CF patients (and neonates).

Fat digestion in neonates 
In the uterus, the fetus is dependent on a high-carbohydrate diet, and lingual as well as gastric lipases are present in the fetus from 26 weeks of gestation on.  After birth, fat in mother's milk or a milk substitute becomes the major source of nutrition. Absorptive rates of dietary fat are much lower in neonates than in adults, 65–80% as compared to >95% respectively, which can be attributed to low pancreatic lipase activity. Furthermore, milk fat is not a good substrate for pancreatic lipase. This fact, in combination with the bile salt deficiency and low pH throughout the gastrointestinal tract of the neonate, demands that lingual lipase be the main enzyme catalyzing the hydrolysis of dietary fat. This enzyme activity has been seen as early as 26 weeks gestational age, with ability to hydrolyze dietary fats variable according to digestive tract maturity.

References 

EC 3.1.1